Sanjay Kumar may refer to:
Sanjay Kumar (activist) (born 1976), Indian homeless advocate
Sanjay Kumar (business executive) (born 1962), Chairman and CEO of Computer Associates International
Sanjay Kumar (professor), director of Centre for the Study of Developing Societies
Sanjay Kumar (soldier) (born 1976), Indian Army soldier who received the Param Vir Chakra
Sanjay Kumar (wrestler, born 1983), Indian Greco-Roman wrestler
Sanjay Kumar (wrestler, born 1967), Indian freestyle wrestler